"This Orient" is a song by English indie rock band Foals. It was released as the lead single from the band's second album, Total Life Forever. It was made available for digital download on 2 May 2010, and received a physical release the next day. The "Starkey remix" version of the song was used in Pro Evolution Soccer 2012.

The song is built around vocal samples, and the meaning behind the song is unclear.

The song peaked at number 97 on the UK Singles Chart.

Track listing

Charts

References

External links
Official website

Foals songs
2010 songs
Transgressive Records singles
2010 singles
Songs written by Yannis Philippakis